Peter Trewavas (born 15 January 1959) is an English musician, known as the bassist of Marillion. He joined in 1982, replacing Diz Minnitt, while acting as a backing vocalist and occasional guitarist.

Trewavas was born in Middlesbrough, but spent much of his childhood in the Buckinghamshire town of Aylesbury. It was in Aylesbury that he became involved in several bands, having most success with The Metros, before taking up his long term role in Marillion.

Trewavas is also a member of the progressive rock supergroup Transatlantic. In 2004, he co-founded another group called Kino, with John Mitchell (Arena), John Beck (It Bites) and Chris Maitland (ex-Porcupine Tree).

In 2011, Pete Trewavas joined up with his longtime friend Eric Blackwood to form the duo Edison's Children. The new project was designed to be a creative outlet for Pete Trewavas (who has traditionally recorded in a "band" or "group" format on bass and acoustic guitar), in which he could also play lead guitar, lead vocals, drum programming and keyboards as well as have full creative control over the writing and producing of the record with. The 72-minute concept album In The Last Waking Moments... about a man fighting to understand if a recent bizarre happening was reality or a descent into madness, was released on 11.11.11.

The Edison's Children project would result in the release of the single "A Million Miles Away (I Wish I Had A Time Machine)". The song debuted on American Commercial Radio in June 2012 and by September it had reached the FMQB U.S. Commercial Radio Top 40 where it remained for 10 weeks (and stayed in the top 100 for 25 weeks) peaking at No. 32.

Edison's Children did live performances in Montreal, Wolverhampton England and Port Zelande Netherlands opening up for Marillion's "Brave" performances during the Marillion 2013 Weekend. The Montreal show was recorded and released as a B-Side on their "In the Last Waking Moments..."-EP Single. The UK show was released on their latest album "Somewhere Between Here and There".

Edison's Children released their second album, The Final Breath Before November, on 13 December 2013. It was mixed by Jakko Jakszyk, lead singer of King Crimson, John Mitchell, lead guitarist of It Bites, and Arena and Robin Boult, lead guitarist of Fish. The album featured Eric Blackwood on lead vocals and guitar and composition again along with Henry Rogers of DeeExpus and Touchstone. Pete Trewavas co-wrote and produced the album with Eric Blackwood and played lead guitar and lead vocals on many of tracks along with bass and programming for the symphonic orchestration.

Edison's Children is expecting their third album "Somewhere Between Here and There", a "bridge album" containing 7 new songs and 6 original mixes from The Final Breath Before November by King Crimson's Jakko Jakszyk and John Mitchell, along with the live version of A Million Miles Away from Wolves UK to be released in June 2015. Work has already begun on a 4th epic album which is expected to be much "harder" than the more symphonic The Final Breath Before November.

On 17 September 2012, during a Marillion concert at The Junction in Cambridge, Steve Hogarth announced that Trewavas was now called "Sweet Pea Tremendous" as it was the result of putting his name into an anagram solver.

Trewavas has also appeared in Prog Aid, the charity project set up to raise money for victims of the 2004 tsunami.

Trewavas was a guest musician on English progressive rock band Big Big Train's 2007 album, The Difference Machine.

Primarily a bassist, Trewavas has also been known to write keyboard parts during his time with Transatlantic, and has played acoustic guitar on Marillion songs, particularly "Faith" and "Now She'll Never Know". With Edison's Children, Trewavas commonly plays lead guitar, lead vocals, symphonic orchestral programming, guitar synthesizer, drum programming and several middle-eastern instruments.

On 11 January 1999 Trewavas was hit by a car when cycling home from the studio Racket Club. He suffered multiple injuries and spent time in intensive care, and underwent surgery in his leg.

Trewavas is a fan of the Football team Manchester United F.C.

Equipment 

Trewavas uses:
 Laney Amplification and Ibanez Bass Guitars
 Laney B2 power amp & cabinets
 Laney RWB300 Combo
 Ibanez RDB Bass
 Fender Precision Bass
 Fender Jazz Bass
 Squier Precision Bass
 Squier Jazz Bass
 Rickenbacker 4080 double-neck bass/guitar
 Warwick Basses
 Elites stadium series 45–105 strings
 TC Electronic D-Two multi-tap rhythm delay processor
 Various Boss effects pedals: Delay, EQ, Chorus, Distortion, Octaver
 Sennheiser wireless system
 Roland PK5 Bass Pedals Controller

References

External links

 Pete Trewavas' homepage at Marillion.com
 Kino official homepage

1959 births
Living people
Acoustic guitarists
English bass guitarists
English male guitarists
Kino (British band) members
Male bass guitarists
Marillion members
People from Middlesbrough
Transatlantic (band) members